Edward T. Vebell (May 25, 1921 – February 9, 2018) was an American fencer and illustrator.

Early life 
Vebell was born in Chicago, to Lithuanian parents. He  attended art school from the age of fourteen.

Sport 
Vebell competed in the individual (semi-finalist) and team épée events at the 1952 Summer Olympics. Vebell was elected to the US Fencing Hall of Fame in April 2014.

Illustrator 

After working as an illustrator in Chicago, Vebell enlisted in the United States army during World War II. He became a staff artist for Stars & Stripes, and was an official courtroom artist for the Nuremberg war trials. Many of his Nuremberg works are now in the United States Holocaust Memorial Museum.

As a professional illustrator and artist, his commissions include work for the United States Postal Service.  He also executed commissions for many periodicals, including a long run as Reader's Digest's most popular illustrator.

Later life 
After the war, he moved to Westport with his wife, Elsa Cerra. They had three daughters.

In February 2018 he was honored by the Westport Historical Society with an autobiographical exhibit that paid homage to his career and achievements.

He died on February 9, 2018, aged 96.

Works

References

External links

 Norman Rockwell Museum, "An Afternoon with Illustration Legend Ed Vebell", July 2010.
Artwork by Edward Vebell
Bedford Fine Art Gallery: Edward T. Vebell
The Curious Case of Ed Vebell: Westport Historical Society

1921 births
2018 deaths
American male épée fencers
Olympic fencers of the United States
Fencers at the 1952 Summer Olympics
Artists from Chicago
Sportspeople from Chicago
American illustrators
Pan American Games medalists in fencing
Pan American Games gold medalists for the United States
Pan American Games silver medalists for the United States
Pan American Games bronze medalists for the United States
Fencers at the 1951 Pan American Games
World War II artists
United States Army artists
Medalists at the 1951 Pan American Games
United States Army personnel of World War II
American people of Lithuanian descent